The 2001–02 NBA season was the 56th season of the National Basketball Association. The season ended with the Los Angeles Lakers winning their third straight  championship, beating the New Jersey Nets 4–0 in the 2002 NBA Finals.

Notable occurrences

 Kwame Brown became the first high school player to be drafted first overall when the Washington Wizards drafted him in the 2001 NBA draft.
 The Grizzlies relocated from Vancouver, British Columbia to Memphis, Tennessee. They played their first three seasons at The Pyramid in Memphis.
 The 2002 NBA All-Star Game was held at First Union Center in Philadelphia. Kobe Bryant of the Lakers took MVP honors amidst boos from the Philadelphia fans following a 135–120 victory by the West. Philadelphia was originally slated to host the 1999 All-Star Game, but was awarded the 2002 game instead due to the 1998 lockout.
 Prior to the start of the season, NBA and Chicago Bulls guard Michael Jordan, then part-owner of the Washington Wizards, announced his second comeback to the NBA, this time with the Wizards. The announcement was delayed due to the September 11 attacks.
 The Dallas Mavericks played their first game at the American Airlines Center, not to be confused with the American Airlines Arena (now Miami-Dade Arena) in Miami, Florida.
 This was the last season that both NBC and TBS televised NBA games.
 NBA teams wore patches on their jerseys with the American flag and a red-white-and-blue ribbon, in honor of the victims of the September 11 attacks. The Raptors wore the American and Canadian flags on their jerseys.
 The only Canadian team left in the NBA, the Toronto Raptors, after losing seventeen of eighteen to drop to 30–38, won twelve of their last fourteen to finish at 42–40 and go to the NBA playoffs as the seventh seed in the East.
 The New Jersey Nets, who had never won fifty games in a season and had only been to the second round of the playoffs once, won 52 games to reach the Finals. With the Nets appearing in the Finals, the Denver Nuggets remain, as of 2020–21, the only former ABA team to have never reached the NBA Finals.
 2001–02 is one of the most memorable seasons in the history of the Milwaukee Bucks. The team got off to a division-leading 26–13 start, and were 10 games over .500 as late as March 6. However, the Bucks lost 16 of their last 22 games and missed the playoffs, one of the biggest late-season collapses for a team that was contending for a division title in March.
 For the first time since 1985–86, no team won fewer than twenty games. The Chicago Bulls and Golden State Warriors shared the league's worst record of 21–61. This had however previously occurred during every season between 1973–74 and 1978–79 and again from 1983–84 to 1985–86.
 Former All-Star Jayson Williams was charged with the murder of his limousine driver on February 14. He was immediately fired from his spot on NBC's Verizon Wireless at the Half shortly after appearing on TV during the All-Star Game the previous week.
 Marv Albert and Mike Fratello were involved in a limousine crash prior to the start of the 2002 Playoffs and were unable to announce for NBC. Albert returned to announce the 2002 Western Conference Finals and NBA Finals.
 The San Antonio Spurs played their final season at the Alamodome.
 The zone defense was legalized.
 The defensive three-second violation was introduced.
 This season marked the last time the NBA playoffs used a best–of–five series in the first round. Started from next season onwards, the playoffs first-round series switched to the best–of–seven format.
 Notable incidents occurred during the playoffs. During the Magic–Hornets series, Baron Davis's game-winner was waved off in time at the buzzer by referee Bernie Fryer, in the Nets–Pacers series, Reggie Miller hit the turnaround 40-foot three–pointer at the buzzer at the end of regulation was made by referee Bob Delaney, and lastly in the Kings–Lakers series, Samaki Walker hit a three–pointer at the buzzer at the end of the first half and then Robert Horry hit a game–winning three–pointer at the buzzer. Following the season, the NBA instituted new rules regarding the end-of-period indicators. An LED light strip on the backboard and the scorer's table replaced the traditional electric red light behind the backboard, and a shot clock visible to all three viewable sides was mandated.
 Game 6 of the Western Conference Finals series between the Kings and the Lakers is considered to be one of the most controversial games in NBA history, as numerous questionable calls went against the Kings in the fourth quarter. The Lakers, led by O'Neal's 41 points and 17 rebounds, won, 106–102, setting the stage for Game 7 in Sacramento. There are allegations that the game was affected by the referees in relationship to the Tim Donaghy scandal.
 This season marked the first time the league's scoring leader (in this case Allen Iverson) failed to make the All-NBA First Team.

2001–02 NBA changes
Dallas Mavericks – added new logo and new uniforms, replacing blue and green with dark navy blue, grey and black, and moved into their new arena the American Airlines Center.
Detroit Pistons – added new logo and new uniforms, also brought back original red, white and blue colors replacing teal and maroon, added side panels to their jerseys and shorts.
Los Angeles Lakers – added new logo changed from a lighter purple to a darker purple still remained with the gold and black color.
New York Knicks – slightly changed their uniforms, removed from the jersey numbers with side stripes and panels to their shorts.
Memphis Grizzlies – relocation from Canada to the United States, and moved to Memphis, Tennessee. Changed wordmark on their jerseys.
Miami Heat – added new red alternate uniforms with black side panels to their jerseys and shorts.
Milwaukee Bucks – slightly changed their uniforms, added side panels to their jerseys.
Seattle SuperSonics – added new logo and new uniforms, also brought back original yellow and emerald green colors replacing dark green and red.

Standings

By division

Eastern Conference

Western Conference

By conference

Notes
z – Clinched home court advantage for the entire playoffs
c – Clinched home court advantage for the conference playoffs
y – Clinched division title 
x – Clinched playoff spot

Playoffs
Teams in bold advanced to the next round. The numbers to the left of each team indicate the team's seeding in its conference, and the numbers to the right indicate the number of games the team won in that round. The division champions are marked by an asterisk. Home court advantage does not necessarily belong to the higher-seeded team, but instead the team with the better regular season record; teams enjoying the home advantage are shown in italics.

Statistics leaders

Awards

Yearly awards
Most Valuable Player: Tim Duncan, San Antonio Spurs
Rookie of the Year: Pau Gasol, Memphis Grizzlies
Defensive Player of the Year: Ben Wallace, Detroit Pistons
Sixth Man of the Year: Corliss Williamson, Detroit Pistons
Most Improved Player: Jermaine O'Neal, Indiana Pacers
Coach of the Year: Rick Carlisle, Detroit Pistons
Executive of the Year: Rod Thorn, New Jersey Nets
Sportsmanship Award: Steve Smith, San Antonio Spurs

All-NBA First Team:
F – Tracy McGrady, Orlando Magic
F – Tim Duncan, San Antonio Spurs
C – Shaquille O'Neal, Los Angeles Lakers
G – Kobe Bryant, Los Angeles Lakers
G – Jason Kidd, New Jersey Nets

All-NBA Second Team:
F – Kevin Garnett, Minnesota Timberwolves 
F – Chris Webber, Sacramento Kings
C – Dirk Nowitzki, Dallas Mavericks
G – Gary Payton, Seattle SuperSonics
G – Allen Iverson, Philadelphia 76ers

All-NBA Third Team
F – Jermaine O'Neal, Indiana Pacers
F – Ben Wallace, Detroit Pistons
C – Dikembe Mutombo, Philadelphia 76ers
G – Paul Pierce, Boston Celtics
G – Steve Nash, Dallas Mavericks

NBA All-Defensive First Team:
F – Tim Duncan, San Antonio Spurs
F – Kevin Garnett, Minnesota Timberwolves
C – Ben Wallace, Detroit Pistons
G – Gary Payton, Seattle SuperSonics
G – Jason Kidd, New Jersey Nets

NBA All-Defensive Second Team
F – Clifford Robinson, Detroit Pistons
F – Bruce Bowen, San Antonio Spurs
C – Dikembe Mutombo, Philadelphia 76ers
G – Doug Christie, Sacramento Kings
G – Kobe Bryant, Los Angeles Lakers

NBA All-Rookie First Team:
Shane Battier, Memphis Grizzlies
Pau Gasol, Memphis Grizzlies
Andrei Kirilenko, Utah Jazz
Tony Parker, San Antonio Spurs
Jason Richardson, Golden State Warriors

All-Rookie Second Team:
Eddie Griffin, Houston Rockets
Richard Jefferson, New Jersey Nets
Joe Johnson, Phoenix Suns
Vladimir Radmanović, Seattle SuperSonics
Željko Rebrača, Detroit Pistons
Jamaal Tinsley, Indiana Pacers

Players of the month
The following players were named the Eastern and Western Conference Players of the Month.

Rookies of the month
The following players were named the Eastern and Western Conference Rookies of the Month.

Coaches of the month
The following coaches were named Coaches of the Month.

References

 
NBA
2001–02 in Canadian basketball